Dyspessa suavis is a species of moth of the family Cossidae. It was described by Staudinger in 1900. It is found in North Africa, including Algeria and Mauritania.

References

Moths described in 1900
Dyspessa
Moths of Africa